Blaž Gregorc (January 18, 1990) is a Slovenian professional ice hockey defenceman who currently plays for Augsburger Panther of the Deutsche Eishockey Liga (DEL).

He participated at the 2011 IIHF World Championship as a member of the Slovenia men's national ice hockey team.

Career statistics

Regular season and playoffs

International

References

External links

1990 births
Augsburger Panther players
EHC Black Wings Linz players
HC Dynamo Pardubice players
Ice hockey players at the 2014 Winter Olympics
Ice hockey players at the 2018 Winter Olympics
EC KAC players
Living people
Nyköpings Hockey players
Odense Bulldogs players
Olympic ice hockey players of Slovenia
Slovenian ice hockey defencemen
HC Sparta Praha players
Sportspeople from Jesenice, Jesenice
Södertälje SK players
Stadion Hradec Králové players
Växjö Lakers players
HC Vítkovice players
HKMK Bled players
Slovenian expatriate ice hockey people
Slovenian expatriate sportspeople in the Czech Republic
Slovenian expatriate sportspeople in Germany
Slovenian expatriate sportspeople in Sweden
Slovenian expatriate sportspeople in Denmark
Slovenian expatriate sportspeople in Austria
Expatriate ice hockey players in the Czech Republic
Expatriate ice hockey players in Germany
Expatriate ice hockey players in Sweden
Expatriate ice hockey players in Denmark
Expatriate ice hockey players in Austria